Even Jostein Pellerud (born 15 July 1953) is a Norwegian football coach and former player.

Career
Pellerud played for several clubs, including Vålerenga from 1974 to 1979 and Kongsvinger from 1983 to 1986. He was head coach for the Norway women's national football team from 1989 to 1996, and led the Norway team to silver medal at the inaugural first 1991 Women's World Cup, to world champions at the second in 1995, and to bronze medalists at the 1996 Summer Olympics. In 1997, he was sacked as coach of Lillestrøm, together with Per Brogeland. He had a brief tenure as manager of Danish Superliga club Ikast fS.

He was head coach for the Canada women's national soccer team from 1999 to 2008. In 2003, he led team Canada to fourth place in the 2003 Women's World Cup. He led team Canada to the 2008 Summer Olympics, where they finished in an impressive 5th place. He announced his retirement at the end of his contract with Canada in December 2008. He has subsequently come out of retirement and on 16 January 2009 it was announced that he was hired to be the coach of the Trinidad and Tobago women's national football team as well as the country's women's under-20 and girls' under-17 teams.

He was educated at Norwegian School of Sport Sciences.

On 6 December 2012, the Norwegian football association (NFF) announced that Pellerud had signed a four-year contract as the chief trainer of the Norway women's national team. On 12 August 2015, he resigned as the chief trainer of the Norway women's national team.

References

External links

1953 births
Living people
Norwegian footballers
Vålerenga Fotball players
Kongsvinger IL Toppfotball players
Norwegian football managers
Kongsvinger IL Toppfotball managers
Norway women's national football team managers
Lillestrøm SK managers
Canada women's national soccer team managers
1991 FIFA Women's World Cup managers
1995 FIFA Women's World Cup managers
2003 FIFA Women's World Cup managers
2007 FIFA Women's World Cup managers
2015 FIFA Women's World Cup managers
FIFA Women's World Cup-winning managers
Norwegian expatriate football managers
Expatriate football managers in Denmark
Expatriate soccer managers in Canada
Norwegian expatriate sportspeople in Canada
Norwegian School of Sport Sciences alumni
Norwegian expatriate sportspeople in Denmark
UEFA Women's Championship-winning managers
Association football midfielders
Sportspeople from Kongsvinger